Shannon McCormick is an American film and voice actor. He is known for his work with Rooster Teeth, voicing Agent Washington in Red vs. Blue and Professor Ozpin in RWBY.

His other roles include Kuroudo Akabane in GetBackers, Masahiro Tamano / Tanma in Wedding Peach and Arkillo, John Constantine, Shazam, and the Riddler in DC Universe Online. McCormick also has experience as an improv comedian.

Filmography

Film

Television

Video games

Web

References

External links 
 
 
 

Living people
American male video game actors
American male voice actors
People from Atlantic, Iowa
Iowa Democrats
Texas Democrats
Rooster Teeth people
American male film actors
20th-century American male actors
21st-century American male actors
21st-century American screenwriters
Year of birth missing (living people)